The FC Basel 1942–43 season was the fiftieth season since the club's foundation on 15 November 1893. FC Basel played their home games in the Landhof in the district Wettstein in Kleinbasel. Albert Besse was the club's chairman for the fourth consecutive season.

Overview 
Eugen Rupf was the team's player-coach during this season and it was his third season as first team manager. Basel played 33 games in their 1942–43 season. 26 in the Nationalliga, three in the cup and four were test games. They won 12, drew five and lost 16 times. In total including the test games and the cup competition they scored 59 goals and conceded just 67. Of the four test games three were won and one was drawn. There was a fifth test match against Lausanne-Sport in Lausanne, but date and result are unknown.

There were 14 teams contesting in the 1942–43 Nationalliga. The team that finished in last position in the league table would be relegated. Rupf and his team had won promotion the previous season and thus it was clear that this was going to be a difficult year. Things started badly and five of the first six games ended with a defeat. Shortly before Christmas, Basel suffered their biggest defeat of the season, a 1–9 dubbing by Servette. Up until today this is still the highest score defeat that Basel have suffered in their domestic league history. However, this is shared with another match 45 years later. On 15 August 1987, in another away game, Basel were also defeated 1–9 this by Xamax.

However, despite this defeat, with the following 3–0 away game victory against their direct opponents Luzern, who also playing at risk of relegation near the bottom of the table, and a 2–0 home game victory against their other direct opponents Nordstern, Basel ended the season with 18 points in 13th position, just two points above local rivals Nordstern, who ended the season on the relegation spot. Of their 26 league games Basel won seven, drew four and lost 15 times. They scored 29 league goals and conceded 57. Hermann Suter was the team's top league goal scorer with six goals. Erich Andres and Rodolfo Kappenberger were joint second best scorers, each with five goals.

In the Swiss Cup Basel started in the 4th principal round with a home tie at the Landhof against lower tier local side FC Pratteln. This ended with an expected easy 6–0 victory. In the round of 16 Basel were also allocated with a home match against lower tier SV Schaffhausen. Hermann Suter and Fritz Schmidlin were both able to achieve a hat-trick and Basel won 9–2. Then in the quarter-finals Basel were drawn at home against top tier Lugano. However, a 0–2 defeat ended their presence in this season's cup competition.

Players 

 
 
 

 

 

 

  

 

Players who left the squad

Results

Legend

Friendly matches

Pre-season

Winter break

Nationalliga

League matches

League table

Swiss Cup

See also 
 History of FC Basel
 List of FC Basel players
 List of FC Basel seasons

References

Sources 
 Rotblau: Jahrbuch Saison 2014/2015. Publisher: FC Basel Marketing AG. 
 Die ersten 125 Jahre. Publisher: Josef Zindel im Friedrich Reinhardt Verlag, Basel. 
 FCB team 1942/43 at fcb-archiv.ch
 Switzerland 1942/43 by Erik Garin at Rec.Sport.Soccer Statistics Foundation

External links
 FC Basel official site

FC Basel seasons
Basel